Kameeldrift is a suburb / farming area of Pretoria. It is located 20 km north east of Pretoria CBD.  The center of this small community is the primary school, named Kameeldrift Laerskool.

The Kameeldrift Police Precinct consists of 5 sectors:
Sector 1
 Downbern
 Wallmanstahl
 Paardefontein

Sector 2A
 Rynoue
 Buffelsdrift
 Kameeldrift

Sector 2B
 Pumulani
 Walmaranspoort
 Derdepoort

Sector 2C
 Zeekoegat
 Roodeplaat
 Kameeldrift

Sector 3/4
 Leeuwfontein
 Baviaanspoort
 Kameelfontein

References

External links
Kameeldrift Police Precinct
Kameeldrift Reservist Police
Kameeldrift Reformed Church (Kameeldrift Gereformeerde Kerk)

Suburbs of Pretoria